Bodø HK is a Norwegian handball team located in Bodø. Their home matches are played at Bodø Spektrum. They compete in GRUNDIGligaen.

European record

Team

Current squad 

Squad for the 2018–19 season

Goalkeepers (GK)
 1   Trygve-johan Fresvik Jensen
 16  Simon Sejr Jensen
Left Wingers (LW)
 3   Joachim Tennes
 5   Gustav Halvorsen
Right Wingers (RW)
 6   Håvard Benjaminsen
 20  Preben Egeli
 75  Andrius Mikko
Pivots (P)
 7   Matko Rotim 
 13  Jonas Ask Kristoffersen 
 15  Sverre Andreassen Bjørbæk 

Left Backs (LB)
 24  Henrik Bielenberg
 25  Sturle Erland
Central Backs (CB)
 9   Djordje Djekic
 13 Erik Nordskag
Right Backs (RB)
 23  Erlend Sund
 40  Daniel Jakobsen

External links

Handball clubs established in 1953
1953 establishments in Norway
Norwegian handball clubs
Sport in Bodø